Cuproxena serrata is a species of moth of the family Tortricidae. It is found in Oaxaca, Mexico.

References

Moths described in 1991
Cuproxena